Samuel Ross Mason, also spelled Meason (November 8, 1739 – 1803), was a Virginia militia captain, on the American western frontier, during the American Revolutionary War. After the war, he became the leader of the Mason Gang, a criminal gang of river pirates and highwaymen on the lower Ohio River and the Mississippi River in the late 18th and early 19th centuries. He was associated with outlaws around Red Banks, Cave-in-Rock, Stack Island, and the Natchez Trace.

Early life
Mason was born in Norfolk, Virginia, and raised in what is now Charles Town, West Virginia, formerly a part of Virginia. According to Lyman Draper, in the 1750s Mason got his earliest start in crime as a teenager, by stealing the horses of Colonel John L. Hite, in Frederick County, Virginia, being wounded and caught by his pursuers. He moved from Charles Town to what is now Ohio County, West Virginia, also at that time a part of Virginia, in 1773.

American Revolutionary War service

During the American Revolution, Samuel Mason was a captain of the Ohio County Militia, Virginia State Forces. According to Ohio County court minutes, dated January 7, 1777, Mason was recommended to Patrick Henry, the Governor of Virginia, to serve as captain of the militia. On January 28, he was present and cited as a captain from Ohio county at a "council of war" held at Catfish Camp. Catfish Camp was located at or near present-day Washington, Pennsylvania.

On  June 8, 1777, Mason wrote a letter from Fort Henry, Virginia, now present-day Wheeling, West Virginia, to brigadier general Edward Hand, at Fort Pitt, now present-day Pittsburgh, Pennsylvania. The letter he wrote was signed Samuel Meason. On September 1, 1777, Captain Mason was wounded but survived an ambush by Native Americans near Fort Henry. Most of the men in his Virginia Militia company perished during the attack. 

From August 11-September 14, 1779 Samuel Mason while at Fort Henry accompanied Colonel Daniel Brodhead and his 8th Pennsylvania Regiment of the Continental Army combined with militia troops from Fort Pitt to destroy ten tribal villages of the pro-British Seneca tribe in northeastern Pennsylvania during the Sullivan Expedition in retaliation for the devastating Iroquois attacks in the Cobleskill, Wyoming Valley and Cherry Valley massacres of 1778. 

According to court martial records in Ohio County, Virginia, Captain Mason was still on duty as an officer in the Ohio County, Virginia Militia at Fort Henry until 1781. He appeared at the court martials and was present as a witness for military proceedings against other soldiers. Samuel Mason appeared twice at the Ohio County courthouse in Wheeling on November 7, 1780, and May 7, 1781.

Honest pursuits
In his book, The Outlaws of Cave-In-Rock, Otto A. Rothert stated that Samuel Mason moved again, in 1779, to a part of Virginia, east of Wheeling that is now in present-day Washington County, Pennsylvania, where he was elected justice of the peace and later selected as an associate judge, leaving for an area that was then a part of Virginia and now the present-day State of Kentucky, in 1784. Mason's surname was spelled interchangeably as Meason in many of the early frontier records. This is explained in two family histories of the Mason/Meason family, Pioneer Period and Pioneer People of Fairfield County, Ohio by C. M. L. Wiseman, dated 1901, and Torrence and Allied Families by Robert M. Torrence, dated 1938.

Criminal career
In the early 1790s, Samuel Mason moved his family to the Red Banks on the Ohio River, now Henderson, Kentucky, where he began his full-time criminal activities. He later settled downriver on Diamond Island and engaged in river piracy. By 1797, Mason moved the base of his operations further downriver to Cave-in-Rock on the Illinois side of the river in the Northwest Territory. The Mason Gang of river pirates openly based themselves at the prominent Ohio River landmark known as Cave-in-Rock, a huge shelter cave. Samuel Mason had a brief association with the first known serial killers in America, Micajah and Wiley Harpe, as well as Peter Alston, and possibly John Duff, the counterfeiter. Mason and his gang stayed at Cave-In-Rock until the summer of 1799, when they were expelled by the "Exterminators", a group of regulators under the leadership of Captain Young of Mercer County, Kentucky. 

Samuel Mason moved his operations down the Mississippi River and settled his family in the territory of Spanish Louisiana, now the present-day state of Missouri, and became a highwayman along the Natchez Trace in Mississippi Territory, now the present-day state of Mississippi. It was on the Natchez Trace that Mason received his most infamous nickname. He would leave a message after each crime (often in the blood of his murdered victims) proudly stating, "Done by Mason of the Woods". In April 1802, Mississippi Territorial Governor William C. C. Claiborne was informed that Mason and Wiley Harpe had attempted to board the boat of a Colonel Joshua Baker between Yazoo, now Yazoo City, Mississippi, and Walnut Hills, now Vicksburg, Mississippi.

Physical appearance
A man named Swaney, who saw Samuel Mason often, described his appearance: "He weighed about two hundred pounds, and was a fine looking man. He was rather modest and unassuming, and had nothing of the raw-head-and-bloody-bones appearance which his character would indicate". Another man, Henry Howe described Mason as: "...a man of gigantic stature and of more than ordinary talents". A William Darby also described him as follows:  "Mason at any time of his life or in any situation, had something extremely ferocious in his look, which arose particularly from a tooth which projected forwards, and could only be covered with his lip by effort".

Arrest, escape, and death
According to Spanish colonial court records, Spanish government officials arrested Samuel Mason and his men, early in 1803, at the Little Prairie settlement, now Caruthersville, in southeastern Missouri. Mason and his gang, including his family members, were taken to the Spanish colonial government in New Madrid, Spanish Upper Louisiana Territory, along the Mississippi River, where a three-day hearing was held to determine whether Mason was truly involved in river piracy, as he had been formally accused of this crime.  

Although he claimed he was simply a farmer, who had been maligned by his enemies, the peculiar presence of $7,000 in currency and twenty human scalps found in his baggage was the damning evidence that convinced the Spanish he indeed was a river pirate. Mason and his family were taken, under armed guard, to New Orleans, the capital of Spanish Lower Louisiana Territory, where the Spanish colonial governor ordered them handed over to the American authorities in the Mississippi Territory, as all crimes they had been convicted of appeared to have taken place in American territory or against American river boats.

While being transported up the Mississippi River, Samuel Mason and gang members John Sutton or Setton, one of the many aliases used by Wiley Harpe, and James May, alias of Peter Alston, overpowered their guards and escaped, with Mason being shot in the head during the escape. One of the 1803 accounts {Rothert. p. 247} claimed Captain Robert McCoy, the commandant of New Madrid, was killed by Mason during their escape. McCoy actually died in 1840, and was neither crippled nor killed by Mason.  

American territorial governor William C. C. Claiborne immediately issued a reward for their recapture, prompting Wiley Harpe and Peter Alston to bring Mason's head, in an attempt to claim the reward money. Whether they killed Mason or whether he died from his wound suffered in the escape attempt has never been established. "Setton" and "May" were recognized and identified as wanted criminals Wiley Harpe and Peter Alston. They were arrested, tried in U.S. federal court, found guilty of piracy, and hanged in Old Greenville, Jefferson County, Mississippi Territory in early 1804.

Gallery

Similarities of Samuel Mason and the Mason Gang to other criminal gangs
From the 1790s-1833, James Ford led a double life while living in Ford's Ferry, Kentucky, as the justice of the peace and the gang leader of a group of highwaymen and river pirates on the Ohio River. From 1863 to 1864, Henry Plummer was the elected sheriff of the gold rush town, Bannack, Montana, in the Idaho Territory. He was later accused of being the leader of an outlaw gang, the Innocents, who stole gold shipments from Bannick, and was hanged by Bannick vigilantes.

In popular culture

In the 1956 Walt Disney television series Davy Crockett and the River Pirates, a Hollywoodized version of Samuel Mason is portrayed by American actor Mort Mills, who appears alongside the Harpe brothers.

In the 1962 John Ford Western epic film How the West Was Won, a Samuel Mason-like frontier outlaw leader of a gang of river pirates is portrayed by Walter Brennan, as the fictional character of Colonel Jeb Hawkins, which alludes to the historical Cave-In-Rock.

See also
Peter Alston
James Ford (pirate)
John Murrell (bandit)
Stack Island (Mississippi River)
Tower Rock

General:
 List of serial killers in the United States

References

Asbury, Herbert. The French Quarter:  The Informal of the New Orleans Underworld
Crumrine, Boyd. Virginia Court Records in Southwestern Pennsylvania: Records of the District of West Augusta and Ohio and Yohogania Counties, Virginia, 1775–1780.  Publisher Genealogical Publishing Com, 1902. , 9780806306247
Kellogg, Louise Phelps.  Frontier Retreat on the Upper Ohio, 1779-1781, Collections, vol. XXIV, Draper series., vol. V.   Madison, WI:  State Historical Society of Wisconsin, 1917.   
Magee, M. Juliette.  Cavern of crime.  Livingston Ledger, 1973.
McBee, May Wilson. The Natchez Court Records, 1767-1805.  Baltimore, MD:  Genealogical Publishing Company, 2009.  
Rothert, Otto A. The Outlaws of Cave-In-Rock.  Cleveland:  1924; rpt. 1996 
Seineke, Kathrine Wagner.  The George Rogers Clark adventure in the Illinois: and selected documents of the American Revolution at the frontier posts  Polyanthos, 1981.
Smith, Carter F. Gangs and the Military: Gangsters, Bikers, and Terrorists with Military Training.  Lanham, MD:  Rowman & Littlefield, 2017.
Thrapp, Dan L.  Encyclopedia of frontier biography, Volume 4, Arthur H. Clark Co., 1988
Wagner, Mark J. The Wreck of the '"America" in Southern Illinois: A Flatboat on the Ohio River.  Carbondale, IL:  Southern Illinois University Press, 2015.
Wagner, Mark and Mary McCorvie. "Going to See the Varmint: Piracy in Myth and Reality on the Ohio and Mississippi Rivers, 1785–1830," X Marks the Spot: The Archaeology of Piracy.  Gainesville, FL:  University Press of Florida, 2006.
Wellman, Paul I. Spawn of evil: the invisible empire of soulless men which for a generation held the Nation in a spell of terror. New York: Doubleday, 1964.

External links
Bell Anthology – Samuel Mason
Sam Mason survives Indian attack, This Day in History, History.Com
Mason and Harpe
Outlaws of Cave-In-Rock, Southern Illinois History Page
Samuel Mason, X Marks the Spot: The Archaeology of Piracy, by Mark Wagner, Book Review, Southern Illinois University, Carbondale
Samuel Mason and Little Harpe, Mississippi Local History Network
Outlaws, Rascals & Ruffians,! Mississippi Local History Network
Samuel Mason at Cave-in-Rock

1739 births
1797 crimes in North America
1803 deaths
18th-century American criminals
18th-century American judges
18th-century American people
18th-century pirates
19th-century American criminals
19th-century American people
19th-century pirates
American escapees
American expatriates in Spain
American folklore
American highwaymen
American justices of the peace
American outlaws
American pirates
American serial killers
American slave owners
Crime families
Drinking establishment owners
Escapees from American detention
Extrajudicial killings
Male serial killers
Mason family
Military personnel from Norfolk, Virginia
Outlaw gangs in the United States
People extradited from Spain
People extradited to the United States
People from Kentucky
People from Natchez, Mississippi
People from New Madrid, Missouri
People from Washington County, Pennsylvania
People from Wheeling, West Virginia
People of Colonial Spanish Louisiana
People of pre-statehood Illinois
People of the Northwest Territory
Virginia militiamen in the American Revolution